Abdulelah Al-Barrih (born 14 July 1997) is a Saudi Arabian professional footballer who plays as a midfielder for Al-Batin.

Career
On 4 October 2016, Al-Barrih signed with Al-Hilal's under-23 team. On 5 September 2018, Al-Barrih joined Al-Washm. On 27 July 2019, Al-Barrih joined Al-Nojoom. On 3 October 2020, Al-Barrih joined Damac on a three-year contract. On 31 January 2021, he joined Al-Tai on a six-month loan. On 18 August 2022, Al-Barrih joined Al-Batin on a two-year deal.

References

External links
 

1997 births
Living people
Saudi Arabian footballers
Association football midfielders
Al Hilal SFC players
Al-Washm Club players
Al-Nojoom FC players
Damac FC players
Al-Tai FC players
Al Batin FC players
Saudi First Division League players
Saudi Professional League players
Saudi Arabian Shia Muslims